Sattar Jabar Alghanem (Arabic:الدكتور ستار الغانم) (born 2 February 1967) is an Iraqi politician who served as a deputy in the Iraqi parliament. He is a leader in the Badr Organization. Holds a PhD in Social Psychology.

Positions 
 Deputy in the Iraqi parliament.
 Worked as a teacher at the Faculty of Arts, Mustansiriya University since 2002.
 Head of Scientific Department, Faculty of Arts, Mustansiriya University, 2003.
 Presented to postgraduate students (Masters and PhD) and supervised several postgraduate studies, and also participated in the discussion of a number of letters and letters
 Head of the Scientific Supervision and Evaluation Unit at the Ministry of Higher Education and Scientific Research - the rank of Undersecretary
 Holds a master's degree from the Faculty of Arts / University of Mustansiriya in 1996.

References

Living people
Badr Brigade members
1967 births
Members of the Council of Representatives of Iraq
University of Baghdad alumni
Iraqi Shia Muslims